Ashley Renaldo Nurse (born 22 December 1988) is a West Indian cricketer who plays first-class, List A and Twenty20 cricket for Barbados. He is a right-arm off-break bowler and a right-handed batsman.

International career
Nurse made his Twenty20 International debut for West Indies against Pakistan on April 21, 2011, where he bowled four overs without picking up any wickets and conceded 33 runs. In his second appearance, against India, he had more impressive figures of 4-0-23-0.

An economical bowler, Nurse made his One Day International (ODI) debut in the second match of the tri-series, against Sri Lanka.

Domestic career
In July 2017, he was named Regional Limited-Overs Cricketer of the Year by the West Indies Players' Association.

In October 2018, Cricket West Indies (CWI) awarded him a white-ball contract for the 2018–19 season. In April 2019, he was named in the West Indies' squad for the 2019 Cricket World Cup. In October 2019, he was selected to play for Barbados in the 2019–20 Regional Super50 tournament. He was the leading wicket-taker for Barbados in the tournament, with 19 dismissals in nine matches.

In July 2020, he was named in the Barbados Tridents squad for the 2020 Caribbean Premier League.

References

External links 

1988 births
Living people
West Indies One Day International cricketers
West Indies Twenty20 International cricketers
Barbados cricketers
Barbados Royals cricketers
Barbadian cricketers
Cricketers at the 2019 Cricket World Cup